Peter Warren may refer to:

Sir Peter Warren (Royal Navy officer) (c. 1703–1752), British naval officer
Peter Warren (cricketer) (born 1953), Australian cricketer
Peter Warren (radio) (born 1939), Canadian investigative journalist and radio host
Peter Warren (archaeologist) (born 1938), leading scholar of the Aegean Bronze Age
Peter Warren (journalist) (born 1960), English investigative freelance journalist and writer
Peter Warren (musician) (born 1935), American jazz bassist
Peter Warren (New Zealand musician) (born 1958, New Zealand drummer